William Pritchard Weston (28 November 1804 – 21 February 1888) was the third Premier of Tasmania.

Early life
William Weston was born in Shoreditch, England, to John Weston, a surgeon. He was educated in Brighton and spent several years working in a merchant's counting house and in the wool trade.

Weston emigrated to Tasmania in 1823, sailing aboard the Adrian with fellow passenger George Arthur, the new lieutenant-governor of Van Diemen's Land. Weston had more than ₤3000 and a letter of recommendation from a friend at the Colonial Office. Originally intending to travel on to Sydney, when the ship docked in Hobart, Weston decided to remain in Van Deimen's Land. On-board, he had met Captain William Clark, whose daughter Ann he went on to marry in 1826 at the Clark's property 'Cluny' in Bothwell.

Weston lived in Bothwell for several years, assisting Horace and Charles Rowcroft, with Charles writing about Weston in his book Tales of the Colonies (London, 1845). Weston purchased a property near Longford, and lived there for many years. He also received a grant of 2500 acres (10 km²). In Longford, Weston built a two storey Regency-style house 'Hythe' in Longford, which was started in 1831 and finished in 1834. He and his wife had eight children, with the eldest dying in infancy.

Public career
He was made a magistrate and with the Rev. John West took a prominent part in the formation of the anti-transportation league which between 1849 and 1853 had an important influence in the success of this movement. Holding office on two occasions. Weston was elected to parliament at the original opening, in 1856 in the electoral district of Ringwood. He served for a short term as Premier from 25 April 1857 until 12 May 1857. He resigned his seat in the Tasmanian House of Assembly on 20 May 1857, instead taking a position in the Tasmanian Legislative Council as the member for Longford on 19 May 1857. He became Premier again on 1 November 1860 holding the position until 2 August 1861.

Later life
Ill-health forced him to resign from the Tasmanian Parliament altogether in the 1860's. He later moved to Victoria, dying in St Kilda. He was survived by a son and five daughters, with his eldest son Edward inheriting his Longford property Hythe, and his second son Maurice inheriting the Cluny property in Bothwell from his Clark grandfather.

References

 

1804 births
1888 deaths
Premiers of Tasmania
Members of the Tasmanian House of Assembly
Members of the Tasmanian Legislative Council
People from Shoreditch
19th-century Australian politicians
English emigrants to colonial Australia